Chloe Wang Le Yan (born 8 July 1986), formerly known as Cynthia Wang Xin Ru, is a Taiwanese actress, singer and host. She is currently managed by label Universal Music Taiwan and Taiwanese artiste management company Phoenix Talent, which is owned by Taiwanese television station Formosa Television, also better known as FTV.

Biography
Wang made her debut as Cynthia Wang at the age of 13 in 1999, starring in her first television advertisement. Subsequently, she hosted several television shows and appeared in music videos and television commercials.

In 2005, she became part of Taiwanese girl group Yummy, which disbanded one year later. On 17 July 2009, Wang released her first album, entitled Copenhagen's Fairy Tales (哥本哈根的童话).

Wang rose to fame, especially in Singapore, after starring in MediaCorp Channel 8 dramas Devotion and Joys of Life in 2011 and 2012 respectively. She was nominated as Best Female Character during the Star Awards 2012, and won the online polls for the Best Overseas Artiste category in the same year. As a result, she became favourite in the media.

In 2013, she made her movie debut as the female lead in Lian Hun – Kua Hai Che Ping and took on the leading role in popular Taiwanese idol drama series IUUI. She changed her name to Chloe Wang in order to boost her career and visibility.

Wang is currently the ambassador for fashion label dENiZEN, along with former UKISS member Alexander Lee Eusebio. As a cat lover, she is a spokesperson for Stray Cats Protection Association in Taipei.

Filmography

Movies

TV shows

Micro-movies

TV hosting

Discography

With Yummy

Albums

As solo artist

Albums

Awards and nominations

References

External links

Chloe Wang on Phoenix Talent

1986 births
Living people
Taiwanese film actresses
20th-century Taiwanese actresses
21st-century Taiwanese actresses
Taiwanese pianists
Taiwanese guitarists
Taiwanese Mandopop singers
Universal Music Group artists
21st-century Taiwanese singers
21st-century Taiwanese women singers
21st-century pianists
21st-century guitarists
21st-century women guitarists
21st-century women pianists